Hola Hola is a song by Nigerian Reggae-dancehall singer Sugarboy, released on 16 January 2016. Information Nigeria characterized the song as a mid-tempo afrobeat reggae tune. The song reach number 9 on Playdata charts, on 13 June 2016. The music video, was directed by Aje Filmworks, and features cameos from DJ Shabsy, and Kiss Daniel. It debuted on MTV Base Nigeria hottest track of 2016. As of April 2022, "Hola Hola" has received 989 thousand streams on Spotify, and 3.7 million views on YouTube.

Background
After signing with G-Worldwide in 2015. He had his first major breakthrough on DJ Shabsy's song "Raba" featuring Kiss Daniel and released on 23 July 2015. The following year, he released "Hola Hola" on 16 January 2016, as the lead single off his debut album Believe, released on 22 April 2017, through G-Worldwide. "Hola Hola" became his first single since he signed with the label in 2015.

In 2021, "Hola Hola" was on the soundtrack list of Suga Suga, a romantic comedy film by G-Worldwide Entertainment.

Commercial performance
During its debut week, "Hola Hola" peaked at number 7 on the Nigeria Playdata charts, and spent 2 consecutive weeks at number 9.

Accolades
On 29 November 2016, he lost the African Entertainment Legend Awards, in the Hit Song of the Year category to Kiss Daniel's "Mama".

Charts

Weekly charts

Year-end charts

Release history

References

2016 songs
2016 singles
Nigerian afropop songs